Best Of is the third compilation album by Australian band Mental As Anything, released in September 1999. The album reached number 42 on the ARIA Charts and was certified gold.

Track listing

Personnel 
 Martin Plaza – lead vocals, guitar
 Wayne de Lisle – drums
 Reg Mombassa – guitar, vocals
 Greedy Smith – lead vocals, keyboards, harmonica
 Peter O'Doherty – bass, vocals

Charts

Certifications

References

1999 compilation albums
Mental As Anything albums
Compilation albums by Australian artists
Albums produced by Elvis Costello
Albums produced by Mike Opitz
Albums produced by Ricky Fataar
Festival Records compilation albums